Kyaka II Refugee Settlement is a refugee camp in Kyegegwa District in western Uganda.

Background 
Kyaka II refugee settlement was established in 2005 to receive the remaining population of Kyaka I following the mass repatriation of Rwandan refugees the same year. After this movement, Kyaka I was closed. Around mid-December 2017, renewed violence in DRC - Democratic Republic of Congo led to a new refugee influx into Uganda, with an estimated 17,000 new refugee arrivals in Kyaka II. 

Since December 2017, Kyaka II’s refugee population has quadrupled, following the arrival of tens of thousands of refugees from DRC fleeing conflict and inter-ethnic violence in North Kivu and Ituri. There are more than 113,000 refugees already living in the settlement. Kyaka II is managed by the UNHCR and the Ugandan Office of the Prime Minister's Department of Refugees (OPM).

Geography 
Kyaka II encompasses 81.5 square kilometres in the three sub counties of Mpara, Kyegegwa and Kabweza in the eponymous Kyaka county. The settlement is divided into nine zones: Sweswe, Buliti, Bukere, Mukondo, Ntababiniga, Kakoni, Bwiriza, Byabakora and Kaborogota.

Health care 
Over 140,000 refugees visit Bujiubuli Health Centre III for medical treatment.

See also 
Kyegegwa District 

UNHCR

References

Refugee camps in Uganda
Kyegegwa District
Populated places in Uganda